The 2003 Mosconi Cup, the 10th edition of the annual nine-ball pool competition between teams representing Europe and the United States, took place 18–21 December 2003 at the MGM Grand in Las Vegas, Nevada. This was the first time, that the competition was held outside England and that there were non-playing captains.

Team USA won the Mosconi Cup by defeating Team Europe 11–9.


Teams

 1 Born outside the United States.

Results

Thursday, 18 December

Friday, 19 December

Saturday, 20 December

Sunday, 21 December

References

External links
 Official homepage

2003
2003 in cue sports
2003 in sports in Nevada
Sports competitions in Las Vegas
2003 in American sports
December 2003 sports events in the United States
MGM Grand Las Vegas